Édouard Frère (27 September 1797, Rouen – 7 April 1874, Rouen) was a French bookseller, archivist, biographer, and historian specialized in the Normandy area.

Life
The son and grandson of booksellers, Frère's father, Jacques-Christophe operated a significant and almost a century-old library on the port of Rouen. Despite having received an education that gave him access to all the liberal professions, Frère's family background gave him a strong taste for books to which he remained faithful until his death. He succeeded his father in 1827 at the family library, and was, from 1827 to 1842, one of those applied and learned booksellers who was of assistance both to letters and its servants. He carried on the traditions of Rouen's most renowned publishers by publishing major works, all related to Normandy, without having misgivings about the considerable sacrifices to his wealth. He repeatedly called on Eustache Hyacinthe Langlois's refined and delicate hand to provide artwork for these books, for he liked his style and loved to encourage his talent.

Once he felt his own erudition was up to par, he thought his turn to engage in writing had come as well. Being passionate about Normandy's traditions and local history as he was, he knew about those subjects as much as could the publisher who, for many years, had successfully brought out the most notable publications about all things Norman. In 1842, Frère sold his library to Lebrument, and he definitely entered scholarship, bringing out very erudite articles on various elements of Norman history, focusing notably on booksellers and old books in a row.

After he published these successful local studies, Frère engaged in his opus magnum, the monumental  Manuel du Bibliographe normand. It was the outcome of a vast research and information gathered from several Norman scholars, which took him five years to complete. This book answered perfectly the expectations promised by its title. Frère owes the better part of his literary and bibliographical notoriety to this work, which ended in every scholar's hands.

Frère was appointed in 1846, recording secretary at the Chamber of Commerce in Rouen. There, he was instrumental to the maritime and industrial trade of his region. Members of the Chamber of Commerce appreciated his extensive training, consistent application, discernment and spirit of wisdom, and they like liked to put his knowledge and experience into service. The depth of his knowledge and the seriousness of his work in 1869 led him to fill in Louis Bouilhet's post as director of the municipal library of Rouen, left vacant by his death. During the few years that Frère spent there, he worked as hard he always did throughout his life.

After he was admitted at the Académie des sciences, belles-lettres et arts de Rouen in 1845, Frère became one of the most frequent and most arduous, augmenting, each year, its précis or its archives with meritorious works universally recognized as thought-provoking. His research on the early days of printing in Normandy, his note on printing and bookselling in Rouen in the 15th and 16th centuries, his considerations on the origins of typography, a complete history of printing in Normandy, the  Catalogue raisonné des manuscrits normands de la Bibliothèque de Rouen, etc. all go to show the range of Frère's fondness for all book related subjects. This attention was not undivided though, as he ventured, on occasion, into the literary field, publishing the Fragments littéraires de Jeanne Grey, a note on French and English minstrels, on Scandinavian literature, a page on the history of the Palinods. This last publication marked his last year as president of the Academy of Rouen, a position he has held since 1867.

In 1869, the Rouen government entrusted him with the preservation of its rich and extensive municipal library. Frère, at once started completing its catalog and review, by increasing the number of notes.

Frère never knew a moment's respite, in his life of seventy-six years, because death caught him when he had just finished printing the Catalogue des manuscrits de la Bibliothèque municipale de Rouen, relatifs à la Normandie.

Frère had been a member of the Société libre d'émulation de la Seine-Inférieure, since 1828. He also belonged to the Society of Antiquaries of Normandy and the Society of Norman Bibliophiles.

Notes

Works 
  Manuel du bibliographe normand ; ou, Dictionnaire bibliographique et historique contenant : l'indication des ouvrages relatifs à la Normandie, depuis l'origine de l'imprimerie jusqu'à nos jours ; des notes biographiques, critiques et littéraires sur les écrivains normands, sur les auteurs de publications se rattachant à la Normandie, et sur diverses notabilités de cette province ; des recherches sur l'histoire de l'imprimerie en Normandie, Rouen, A. Le Brument, 1858–1860 ; reprint New York, Franklin 1964 ; Paris, Librairie Guénéguaud, 1964 ; Genève, Slatkine Reprints, 1971.
  Catalogue des livres rares et curieux, la plupart concernant la Normandie, Rouen, Métérie, 1874.
  Catalogue des manuscrits relatifs à la Normandie, précédé d'une notice sur la formation de la Bibliothèque et ses accroissements successifs, Rouen, Boissel, 1874.
  Considérations sur les origines typographiques, Rouen, Péron, 1850.
  De l'imprimerie et de la librairie à Rouen, dans les XVe et XVIe siècles, et de Martin Morin, célèbre imprimeur rouennais, Rouen, Le Brument, 1843.
  Des livres de liturgie des églises d'Angleterre (Salisbury, York, Hereford), imprimés à Rouen dans les XVe et XVIe siècles : étude suivie du catalogue de ces impressions, de M.CCCC.XCII à M.D.LVII, avec des notes bibliographiques, Rouen, Le Brument, 1867.
  Discours de l'entrée de Louis XIV en sa ville de Rouen, capitale de la province et du duché de Normandie, et séjour qu'il y fit en février 1650 : accompagné de la Reine régente et des principaux personnages de la cour, Rouen, Boissel, 1863.
 Exhibition of a choice collection of water-colour and crayon drawings by the late Edouard Frère at the Old Bond Street Galleries, London, T. Agnew & Sons, 1888.
  Funérailles de Georges d'Amboise, archevêque de Rouen, cardinal, légat du pape, ministre de Louis XII, et gouverneur de la Normandie : célébrées à Lyon et à Rouen du 25 mai au 20 juin 1510, Rouen, Henry Boissel, 1864.
  Guide de l'étranger dans Rouen. Extrait de l'itinéraire de Th. Licquet, Rouen, Le Brument, 1851.
  La féodalité, or, Les droits du seigneur : événements mystérieux, lugubres, scandaleux, exactions, despotisme, libertinage de la noblesse et du clergé, suivis de la marche et de la décadence de la féodalité, depuis le moyen âge jusqu'à nos jours, Paris, Chez l'éditeur, 1800.
  Les Ruines de la coutume de Normandie : ou petit dictionnaire du droit normand restant en vigueur pour les droits acquis, Rouen, Lebrument ; Paris, Durand, 1856.
  Les Veillées littéraires illustrées : choix de romans, nouvelles, poésies, pièces de théâtre, Paris, Bry Ainé, 1849.
  Notice sur la vie et les travaux de Marc-Isambert Brunel, Rouen, Alfred Péron, 1850.
  Recherches sur les premiers temps de l'imprimerie en Normandie, Rouen, Édouard Frère, 1829.
  Rouen : son histoire, ses monuments et ses environs : guide nécessaire aux voyageurs pour bien connaître cette capitale de la Normandie et les localités voisines les plus intéressantes, Rouen, Lebrument, 1861.
  Rouen au dix-septième siècle, Rouen, Le Brument, 1861, 1655.
  Rouen ; son histoire, ses monuments et ses environs. Guide nécessaire aux voyageurs pour bien connaître cette capitale de la Normandie ; suivi de notices sur Dieppe et Arques, Rouen, Le Brument, 1857.
  Une séance de l'Académie des Palinods en 1640, Rouen, Le Brument, 1867.
  Voyage historique et pittoresque de Paris à Rouen, sur la Seine, en bateau à vapeur, Rouen, Édouard Frère, 1839.

External links 
 Édouard Frère on data.bnf.fr

1797 births
1874 deaths
French biographers
French bibliographers
French librarians
19th-century French historians
Writers from Rouen
French male non-fiction writers
19th-century French male writers
Businesspeople from Rouen